Tiruvarur is a state assembly constituency in Tiruvarur district in Tamil Nadu. It is a Scheduled Caste reserved constituency. Changed as General Constituency from 2011 general elections. It consists of Thiruvarur, Koradacherry and part of Kodavasal panchayat union. It is one of the 234 State Legislative Assembly Constituencies in Tamil Nadu, in India.

Madras State

Tamil Nadu

Election results

Election results

2021

2019 By-election

2016

2011

2006

2001

1996

1991

1989

1984

1980

1977

1971

1967

1962

References 

 

Assembly constituencies of Tamil Nadu
Tiruvarur district